Astala is a Finnish surname that may refer to
Juho Astala (1860–1936), Finnish farmer and politician
Kari Astala (born 1953), Finnish mathematician
Sampsa Astala (born 1974), Finnish heavy metal musician
Astala (moth), a genus of bagworm moths in the family Psychidae

See also
Diaethria astala, a butterfly

Finnish-language surnames